Upton-upon-Severn (or Upton on Severn, etc. and locally simply Upton) is a town and civil parish in the Malvern Hills District of Worcestershire, England. Lying on the A4104 (formerly A440), the 2011 census recorded a population of 2,881 for the town. 

The town has a distinctive tower and copper-clad cupola – known locally as the "Pepperpot" – the only surviving remnant of the former church. Its replacement, also dedicated to St Peter and St Paul, was designed by Sir Arthur Blomfield.

History

Until the later half of the 20th century, the bridge at Upton was the only one across the River Severn between Worcester and Tewkesbury; the present bridge was built in 1940. Oliver Cromwell's soldiers crossed the Severn here to win the battle of Upton before the main Battle of Worcester in the English Civil War.

Today
The population of the civil parish in 2011 was recorded at 2,881 – an increase from 2,859 recorded in 2001. The parish extends westward from the town, including the settlement at Tunnel Hill, but does not include the village of Ryall located close to the town, on the other side of the river. Upton is in the West Worcestershire parliamentary constituency.

Upton lies on the banks of the River Severn and is known for its regular flooding. Low-lying areas of Upton suffered serious flooding in 2000. In the 2007 floods, levels exceeded those in 2000, and the town was inaccessible by road. The town's main built up area lies on slightly higher ground than the surrounding countryside, and in the past became an island during severe floods. A connecting causeway now carries the A4104 above the floods to the west, and a viaduct on the other side of the bridge to the east.

The town has three major music festivals, with the spring folk festival, and the summer jazz and blues festivals.

Upton is the home of The White Lion Hotel, a 16th-century coaching inn, where parts of the building date back to 1510. The building has undergone many transformations over the centuries and is easily found on the high street due to its distinctive portico, adorned with its very own lion. Reputed to have played a part in the English Civil War, where soldiers from both sides are alleged to have enjoyed the hospitality of this popular local hostelry prior to the Battle of Worcester. Guests of the hotel can stay in rooms referred to in books VII and VIII of Henry Fielding's classic 1749 novel Tom Jones in which he refers to the hotel as "A house of exceeding good repute"; these rooms retain many of their original features.

Education

Primary education is provided by Upton-upon-Severn CofE Primary School with approximately 160 (2013) pupils on role. Hanley Castle High School, located in a nearby village, provides secondary education for the region.

People

John Dee, mathematician, astronomer and astrologer, was presented the lay rectorship of Upton upon Severn in 1553.
Nigel Mansell, Formula One world champion, born at Baughton near Upton.
Admiral Sir William Tennant, KCB, CBE, MVO, DL (1890–1963), born in Upton.
General Sir George Alexander Weir, KCB, CMG, DSO (1876–1951), born in Upton

Transport

Upton used to be served by Upton-on-Severn railway station, on a branch line Tewkesbury and Malvern Railway from Ashchurch to Malvern, with the intermediate stations Tewkesbury, Ripple, Worcestershire, Upton upon Severn and Malvern Wells (Hanley Road). The Upton to Malvern section closed in December 1952 and the rest in August 1961, before the Beeching Axe.

Bus services 332 and 363 link Upton to Worcester a total of six times per day (Mon-Fri), with four per day on Saturdays.

Upton Marina is home to Mercia Inshore Search and Rescue.

References

Further reading

External links

Town Council
Upton community website

 
Towns in Worcestershire
Civil parishes in Worcestershire
Malvern Hills District
Populated places established in the 9th century
Populated places on the River Severn
9th-century establishments in England